Eugene Brock (May 6, 1853 – December 24, 1911) was an American politician in the state of Washington. He served in the Washington House of Representatives from 1891 to 1895.

References

1853 births
1911 deaths
Republican Party members of the Washington House of Representatives
19th-century American politicians